The 45th Operations Group was a United States Space Force unit.  It was assigned to 45th Space Wing, stationed at Cape Canaveral Space Force Station, Florida. In May 2021, it was inactivated upon the redesignation of the 45th Space Wing to Space Launch Delta 45.

Up until 2003, the 45th Operations Group was responsible for program management and operation of up to five squadrons which perform all Eastern Range launch operations including Delta II, Delta III, Atlas II, Atlas III, Titan IV, Space Shuttle, Pegasus, and Athena space launch vehicles.

The Operations Group provides support to Naval Ordnance Test Unit operations. In support of space launch operations, the Operations Group coordinates training for the wing, manages all wing spacecraft services systems and facilities, and manages the Cape Canaveral Space Force Station Skid Strip and the Patrick Space Force Base air traffic complex, handling more than 24,000 aircraft operations annually.

Components
 1st Range Operations Squadron.  The 1st Range Operations Squadron provides range operations, operations support management, and scheduling services to National Aeronautics and Space Administration, the United States Space Force, United States Navy, and other Department of Defense partners.
 45th Operations Support Squadron. The 45th Operations Support Squadron assures access to space to fulfill war-fighting, CINC and national requirements by providing policy decisions, training, and airfield operations for the 45th Operations Group, while managing all airfield and air traffic control services for the 45th Space Wing.  Its Launch Operations Support Flight Provides behind-the-scenes support for all launches. It helps coordinate tours and launch viewing for distinguished visitors and coordinating launch critical briefings and conferences. Its Airfield Operations Flight manages the Patrick airfield and provides air traffic control services in support of the space range and the National Airspace System.  Its Current Operations Flight coordinates and implements wing-level policies and procedures which provide the structure for launch operations. Its Spacelift Operations Training Flight provides wing training policy and guidance for more than 100 space launch operators.
 45th Range Management Squadron.  The 45th Range Management Squadron provides operations and maintenance services for all range instrumentation and critical launch facilities and quality assurance support to wing and delegated contractual efforts
 45th Space Communications Squadron
 45th Weather Squadron
 Detachment 1, Antigua Air Station, West Indies. This detachment was discontinued on 7 July 2015. It provided telemetry and radar tracking data to support space launches out of the Eastern Range. When not supporting space launches, it provided radar tracking data for locating and cataloging space objects in support of U.S. Space Command's Space Surveillance Network.
 Detachment 2, Ascension Auxiliary Air Field.  This detachment provides telemetry and radar tracking data to support space launches out of the Eastern Range. When not supporting its primary mission, the unit has the secondary mission of providing radar tracking data for locating and cataloging space objects in support of the United States Space Command Space Surveillance Network.
 Detachment 3, Patrick Space Force Base.  This detachment, also known as the Guardian Angels, coordinates DOD contingency support for United States human space flight programs.  Its roots go back to the 1959 charter by the Secretary of Defense as the DOD Mercury Support Office.  Later renamed DOD Manned Space Flight Support Office. Since its inception the office has continued to be the principle facilitator for all DOD contingency support to Projects Mercury, Gemini, and Apollo; the Apollo–Soyuz Test Project; the Space Shuttle Program, the International Space Station/Soyuz Program; the Orion Program; and the presidential commercial space initiative.

History

World War II
The group was organized at Army Air Base, Savannah, Georgia in January 1941 as the 45th Bombardment Group and equipped with Douglas A-20 Havocs (along with a few DB-7s, an export version of the A-20). Its original assigned squadrons were the 78th, 79th and 80th Bombardment Squadrons.  The 17th Reconnaissance Squadron was attached to the group.  In June the group moved to Army Air Base, Manchester, New Hampshire, where the 17th Reconnaissance Squadron was assigned to the group as the 92d Bombardment Squadron.

Following the attack on Pearl Harbor the squadron began flying antisubmarine patrols off the Atlantic coast.  In 1942, it converted to various medium bombers, primarily the Douglas B-18 Bolo, which was equipped with radar for the antisubmarine mission.  The group moved to Dover Army Air Field, Delaware in May 1942 and to Miami Army Air Field, Florida in August.  Its squadrons were dispersed to various bases along the Atlantic and Gulf coasts

In October 1942, the Army Air Forces organized its antisubmarine forces into the single Army Air Forces Antisubmarine Command, which established the 26th Antisubmarine Wing the following month to control its forces operating over the Gulf of Mexico and the Caribbean Sea. The command's bombardment group headquarters, including the 45th, were inactivated and the squadrons, now designated the 7th, 8th, 9th and 10th Antisubmarine Squadrons, were assigned directly to the 26th Wing.

Space operations
 See Space Launch Delta 45 and 45th Launch Group for related lineage and history information
Reactivated as the 45th Operations Group in November 1991 under Air Force Space Command.  Operated "Down-Range" facilities at Antigua, Ascension Island, and Cape Canaveral, Florida; launched DOD payloads into orbit; and collected flight data for evaluation of ballistic missile systems launched from Eastern Launch sites for DOD, NASA, and commercial customers. Provided support for DOD, NASA, and commercial manned and unmanned space programs.

There were several organizational changes in the wing in 1997 and 1998. Detachments 1 and 2 of the 45th Operations Group were inactivated on Antigua and Ascension on 1 June 1997, but they were replaced by Detachments 1 and 2 of the 45th Logistics Group on the same day.  The 5th Space Launch Squadron was inactivated at Cape Canaveral Air Station on 29 June 1998, and its resources were absorbed by the 3rd Space Launch Squadron.

Launch operations were reassigned to the 45th Launch Group on 1 December 2003.

Lineage
 Constituted as the 45th Bombardment Group (Light) on 20 September 1940
 Activated on 15 January 1941
 Redesignated 45th Bombardment Group (Medium) in December 1941
 Inactivated on 8 December 1942
 Redesignated 45th Operations Group on 1 November 1991
 Activated on 12 November 1991

Assignments
 16th Bombardment Wing, 15 January 1941
 1st Air Support Command, 21 August 1941
 I Bomber Command, 5 January 1942
 Army Air Forces Antisubmarine Command, 13 October 1942
 26th Antisubmarine Wing, 20 November–8 December 1942
 45th Space Wing, 12 November 1991 – present

Squadrons
 World War II
 17th Reconnaissance Squadron (later 92d Bombardment Squadron, 92d Reconnaissance Squadron, 433d Bombardment Squadron): (Attached 15 January 1941, assigned 14 August 1941 – 21 November 1942)
 76th Bombardment Squadron: (Air echelon attached c. 21 May – 13 August 1942)
 78th Bombardment Squadron (later 7th Antisubmarine Squadron): 15 January 1941 – 7 December 1942
 79th Bombardment Squadron: 15 January 1941 – 21 November 1942
 80th Bombardment Squadron (later 9th Antisubmarine Squadron): 15 January 1941 – 7 December 1942

 Since 1991
 1st Range Operations Squadron: 1 December 2003 – present
 1st Space Launch Squadron: 12 November 1991 – 1 December 2003
 3d Space Launch Squadron: 1 April 1992 – 1 December 2003
 5th Space Launch Squadron: 14 April 1994 – 29 June 1998
 45th Operations Support Squadron: 12 November 1991 – present
 45th Range Squadron: 12 November 1991 – 1 December 2003
 45th Range Management Squadron: 1 October 2002 – present
 45th Space Communications Squadron: 1 December 2003 – present
 45th Weather Squadron: 12 November 1991 – present

Stations
 Army Air Base, Savannah Army Air Base, Georgia, 15 January 1941
 Army Air Base, Manchester (laer Grenier Field), New Hampshire, 18 June 1941
 Dover Army Air Field, Delaware, 16 May 1942
 Miami Army Air Field, Florida, 1 August – 8 December 1942
 Patrick Space Force Base, Florida, 12 November 1991
 Cape Canaveral Space Force Station, Florida, 1 November 1998 – present

List of commanders

 Col James N. Posey, 12 November 1991
 Col Michael R. Spence, 31 January 1992
 Col Glenn C. Waltman, 20 August 1993
 Col Gary R. Harmon, 28 April 1995
 Col Philip G. Benjamin II, 9 June 1997
 Col Darphaus L. Mitchell, 24 May 1999
 Col Cameron S. Bowser, 11 June 2001
 Col Gregory M. Billman, 7 March 2003
 Col David D. Thompson, 29 June 2005
 Col Bernard J. Gruber, 12 July 2007
 Col James Ross, 21 May 2009
 Col Denette Sleeth, 14 January 2011
 Col Douglas Schiess, 30 July 2012 - 8 Apr 2014
 Col Rob Quigg (acting), 9 April 2014 - 9 Jul 2014
 Col Thomas Falzarano, 10 July 2014 – 10 July 2016
 Col Burton Catledge, 11 July 2016 - 30 Jul 2018
 Col Steve Lang, 31 Jul 2018 - 10 Jul 2019
 Col Mark Shoemaker, 11 July 2019 – present>

References

Notes
 Explanatory notes

 Citations

Bibliography

External links
 

045